Urnatella is a genus of primitive animals (Entoprocta) belonging to the family Barentsiidae.

The species of this genus are found in America.

Species:

Urnatella gracilis

References

Entoprocta